The 2011 J.League Division 1 season was the 46th season of professional football in Japan, and the 19th since the establishment of the J.League. The season began on March 5 and concluded on December 3. The season was put on hold from March 12 to April 23 due to the aftermath of the 2011 Tōhoku earthquake and tsunami, therefore canceling a planned five-week summer break between June 27–July 29 in order to allow preparation of the Japanese national team for the 2011 Copa América.

The 2011 J.League Division 1 champion also qualified to the 2011 FIFA Club World Cup as the host team, entering the qualifying play-off round.

Kashiwa Reysol won a second league title, their first in 39 years and first in the professional J.League era. They also became the first League champions to win the title the season after being promoted as second division champions.

Clubs
FC Tokyo, Kyoto Sanga FC and Shonan Bellmare were relegated at the end of the 2010 season after finishing in the bottom three places of the table. Shonan had only played one season in Division 1 while Kyoto  had enjoyed a three-year stay. FC Tokyo had been in the top flight for eleven seasons.

The three relegated teams were replaced by 2010 J.League Division 2 champions Kashiwa Reysol, runners-up Ventforet Kofu and third-placed team Avispa Fukuoka. Kashiwa had made an immediate return to the top division, while Kofu and Fukuoka ended three- and four-year absences respectively.

Personnel and kits

1 Subject to change during the season.

League table

Results

Top scorers

Awards

MVP 
 Leandro Domingues

Best XI

Attendance

Notes
Note 1: Kashima Antlers played one game at the National Olympic Stadium in Tokyo as the Kashima Soccer Stadium in Kashima was damaged in the 2011 Tōhoku earthquake and tsunami.

In popular culture
This particular season was used as reference in the movie Detective Conan: The Eleventh Striker. Many players in real life actually provide cameo roles for the film, including Kazuyoshi Miura (Yokohama FC), Yasuhito Endō (Gamba Osaka), Yasuyuki Konno (Gamba Osaka), Kengo Nakamura (Kawasaki Frontale), and Seigo Narazaki (Nagoya Grampus). In the movie, a bomber threatens to bomb all the stadiums unless certain conditions are met. The main character, Conan Edogawa, must solve the case and find the culprit. In the movie, two additional fictional teams are added to the squad: Tokyo Spirits and Big Osaka, making the league with 20 teams.

References

J1 League seasons
1
Japan
Japan